Cirrhilabrus briangreenei, the Latigo fairy wrasse, is a species of wrasse that lives at mesophotic reef and rubble patches at depths of  in the Philippines (reports from elsewhere are likely due to confusion with the similar C. pylei). It was known for several years in the marine aquarium trade before its scientific species description in 2020. In an aquarium setting, it will feed on amphipods, brine shrimps, copepods, Cyclops, Daphnia, fish larvae, invertebrates, lobster eggs and zooplankton.

Etymology
Cirrhilabrus briangreenei is named in honor of Brian D. Greene, who in addition to collecting the type specimen, has contributed extensively towards the study and exploration of coral reef diversity through deep technical diving. To be treated as a noun in apposition. The common name "latigo" is Tagalog for "whip," given in reference to the long, slender pelvic fins.

References

briangreenei
Taxa named by Luiz A. Rocha
Fish of the Philippines
Taxa named by Richard Pyle